{{DISPLAYTITLE:C40H56O3}}
The molecular formula C40H56O3 (molar mass: 584.57 g/mol, exact mass: 584.4229 u) may refer to:

 Antheraxanthin
 Capsanthin
 Flavoxanthin

Molecular formulas